South Sea Rose is a 1929 American comedy-drama film distributed by the Fox Film Corporation and produced and directed by Allan Dwan. This picture was Dwan's second collaboration with star Lenore Ulric, their first being Frozen Justice. Much of the cast and crew on Frozen Justice returned for this film.

South Sea Rose is based the 1928 Broadway stage play La Gringa by Tom Cushing which starred then unknown theatre player Claudette Colbert. Like Frozen Justice, this film is now presumed lost.

Cast 
Lenore Ulric – Rosalie Durnay
Charles Bickford – Captain Briggs
Kenneth MacKenna – Doctor Tom Winston
J. Farrell MacDonald – Hackett
Elizabeth Patterson – Sarah
Tom Patricola – Willie Gump
Ilka Chase – The Maid
George MacFarlane – The Tavern Keeper
Ben Hall – The Cabin Boy
Daphne Pollard – Mrs. Nott
Roscoe Ates – The Ship's Cook
Charlotte Walker – The Mother Superior
Emile Chautard – Rosalie's Uncle

References

External links 

 Lobby poster #1
 Lobby poster #2
 3rd Lobby poster
   poster minus the watermark (Wayback Machine)

1929 films
1929 comedy-drama films
Fox Film films
American comedy-drama films
American black-and-white films
American films based on plays
Films directed by Allan Dwan
Films set in French Polynesia
Lost American films
Films with screenplays by Sonya Levien
1929 lost films
Lost comedy-drama films
1920s American films
1920s English-language films
English-language comedy-drama films